Pavlo Pavlovych Virsky (February 2, 1905 –July 5, 1975), PAU, was a Soviet and Ukrainian dancer, ballet master, choreographer, and founder of the Pavlo Virsky Ukrainian National Folk Dance Ensemble, whose work in Ukrainian dance was groundbreaking and influenced generations of dancers.

Early days 
Pavlo Virsky was born on February 25, 1905, in Odesa, Russian Empire. After graduating from the Odesa Music and Drama School in 1927, he continued his studies in Moscow, at the Theater Tekhnikum, from 1927 to 1928. Beginning in 1925, state theaters began to be organized throughout the Ukrainian SSR, allowing for gainful employment for artists, and upon his return to Odesa in 1928, Virsky joined the Odesa Opera and Ballet Theatre as a dancer and choreographer. It was at this theater that he collaborated with Mykola Bolotov in their first joint production: Gliere's The Red Poppy. Virsky left Odesa in 1931, and worked as a ballet master at various theatres, including those in Kharkiv, Dnipropetrovsk, and Kyiv, working on productions of ballets such as Raymonda, La Esmeralda, Le Corsaire, Swan Lake, and Don Quixote.

Folk dance 

The Kyiv Opera and Ballet brought two productions to Moscow in 1936 as part of the first festival of Ukrainian Literature and Art: Mykola Lysenko's opera Natalka Poltavka, and Semen Hulak-Artemovsky's opera Zaporozhets za Dunayem (A Zaporizhian [Kozak] Beyond the Danube), the latter which included choreographed Ukrainian folk dances by Pavlo Virsky and Mykola Bolotov. The following year, Virsky and Bolotov founded the State Folk Dance Ensemble of the Ukrainian SSR, with which they developed an entire program of staged Ukrainian folk dances. With the outbreak World War II, and in the build-up to the German-Soviet War, many ensembles suspended activity, as performers were enlisted to entertain the troops. Virsky continued his work with folk-themed choreography as the director of the Red Flag Song and Dance Ensemble of the Kyiv Military District beginning in 1939. In 1942, he left as that ensemble, and became the artistic director of the Red Army Song and Dance Ensemble dancers, and remained in that post for many years.

In 1955, Virsky returned to Kyiv to helm the State Folk Dance Ensemble of the Ukrainian SSR he founded, which had been reconstituted by others after the conclusion of the war. For the next 20 years (until his death in 1975) Pavlo Virsky developed the concepts of Ukrainian folk-stage dance further than had previously been imagined. He founded a school to train dancers in the technique he developed. He toured the world with his dancers, influencing Ukrainian dancers the world over.

Virsky died on July 5, 1975, in Kyiv. The State Folk Dance Ensemble of the Ukrainian SSR was named after him in 1977.

References

External links 
Ukrainian Weekly Article
Official Website of Ukrainian National Folk Dance Ensemble Named After P.Virsky

1905 births
1975 deaths
20th-century Russian ballet dancers
Dancers from Odesa
People from Kherson Governorate
Communist Party of the Soviet Union members
People's Artists of the USSR
Stalin Prize winners
Recipients of the Order of Friendship of Peoples
Recipients of the Order of the Red Banner of Labour
Recipients of the Order of the Red Star
Recipients of the title of People's Artists of Ukraine
Recipients of the Shevchenko National Prize
Recipients of the USSR State Prize
Ballet choreographers
Dance teachers
Ukrainian people in the Russian Empire
Russian choreographers
Russian male ballet dancers
Soviet choreographers
Soviet male ballet dancers
Ukrainian choreographers
Ukrainian male ballet dancers
Burials at Baikove Cemetery